Discovery Kids (stylized as Discovery K!ds) is a brand name owned by Warner Bros. Discovery. Starting as a television segment within the Discovery Channel, the brand expanded as a separate television channel. Most of its worldwide channels were either rebranded or shut down, but the brand still exists as a website for children's activities and consumer products. 

As of 2022, Discovery Kids-branded channels exist in India, Latin America, and the United States as a Spanish-language daytime programming block on Discovery Familia. 

Current television channels
Discovery Kids India
Discovery Kids Latin America
 Discovery Kids en Español, a Spanish-language daytime programming block on Discovery Familia

Former channels
 Discovery Kids Australia
 DKids
 Discovery Kids Southeast Asia
 Discovery Kids UK, time-shared with Discovery Wings, both channels were replaced by Discovery Turbo on February 28, 2007
 Discovery Kids USA, formed a joint venture with Hasbro and renamed the Hub Network in October 2010 and Discovery Family in October 2014.
 Discovery Kids Canada

See also 
Discovery Family
Discovery Familia
Discovery Turbo

External links 
 

 
Children's television networks
Television channels and stations established in 1996
Warner Bros. Discovery brands
Warner Bros. Discovery networks